Agathymus evansi, the huachuca giant-skipper, is a species of giant skipper in the butterfly family Hesperiidae. It is found in Central America and North America.

The MONA or Hodges number for Agathymus evansi is 4135.

References

Further reading

External links

 

Megathyminae
Articles created by Qbugbot
Butterflies described in 1950